The Jacobite Syrian Christian Church (JSCC), or the Malankara Archdiocese of the Syrian Orthodox Church in India also known as Malankara Jacobite Syrian Orthodox Church, the Jacobite Syrian Church, and the Syriac Orthodox Church in India, is a catholicate based in Kerala, India, of the Syriac Orthodox Church of Antioch and part of the Oriental Orthodox Church. It recognizes the Syriac Orthodox Patriarch of Antioch and All the East as supreme head of the church. It functions autonomously within the church, administered by the Metropolitan Trustee, under the authority of the Maphrian of India, Baselios Thomas I. Following schism with the Malankara Orthodox Syrian Church, is currently the only church in Malankara that is directly under a Syriac Christian Antiochian hierarchy, claiming continuity to the 1665 schism. The church employs the West Syriac Rite Liturgy of Saint James.

Name
Emperor Justin I supported the Chalcedonians. Severus of Antioch, who was not a Chalcedonian, was exiled to Egypt and died in 538 AD. Three bishops remained in the church, and at that time Jacob Baradeus restored the church with Queen Theodra's help.

Headquarters 
Puthencruz is the headquarters of the Jacobite Syrian Christian Church in India. It is registered as a society under the Societies Act of the Government of India. Its headquarters are named after Ignatius Zakka I. The property was bought and built under the leadership of Baselios Thomas I after the church faced difficulties in continuing its operations in Muvattupuzha after Baselios Paulose II's death.

History

It is believed that Saint Thomas Christians of Malabar were in communion with the Church of the East from 295 AD to 1599. They received episcopal support from Syriac bishops, who traveled to Kerala in merchant ships along the spice route, while the local leader of the Saint Thomas Christians held the rank of archdeacon, which was a hereditary office held by the Pakalomattam family. In the 16th century, the overtures of the Portuguese padroado to bring the Saint Thomas Christians into Latin Rite Catholicism led to the first of several rifts in the community due to Portuguese colonialists, and the establishment of the Syro-Malabar Church and the Malankara Church factions. Since then, further splits have occurred, and the Saint Thomas Christians are now divided into several factions.

Saint Thomas Christians were administratively under the single native dynastic leadership of an archdeacon (a native ecclesiastical head with spiritual and temporal powers, deriving from the Greek term arkhidiākonos) and were in communion with the Church of the East centered in Persia, from at least 496 AD. The indigenous Church of Malabar/Malankara followed the faith and traditions handed over by the apostle St. Thomas. In the 16th century, the Portuguese Jesuits deliberately attempted to annex the native Christians to the Catholic Church, and in 1599 they succeeded through the Synod of Diamper. Resentment against these forceful measures caused the majority of the community under Archdeacon Thomas to swear an oath never to submit to the Portuguese, known as the Coonan Cross Oath, in 1653. The Malankara Church consolidated under Thoma I welcomed Gregorios Abdal Jaleel, who regularized the canonical ordination of Thoma as a bishop.

Meanwhile, the Dutch East India Company defeated the Portuguese and gained supremacy over the spice trade in Malabar in 1663. The Malankara church used this opportunity to escape from Catholic persecution with the company's help. At the church's request, the Dutch brought Gregorios Abdal Jaleel of Jerusalem, a bishop of the Syriac Orthodox Church, aboard their trading vessel in 1665. Thoma I formed a relationship with the Syriac Orthodox Church and gradually adopted West Syriac liturgy and practices.

As part of the Syriac Orthodox communion, the church uses the West Syriac liturgy and is part of the Oriental Orthodox group of churches. It has dioceses in most parts of India as well as in the United States, Canada, the United Kingdom, Western Europe, the Persian Gulf, Australia, and New Zealand. In 2003 it was estimated that the church had 1,000,000 (including Knanaya) members globally.

Hierarchy 
The highest rank in the ecclesiastical hierarchy is the patriarch. The second-highest rank is the maphrian, also known as the Catholicos of India, and is the head of the Jacobite Syrian Church in India. There are metropolitan bishops or archbishops, and auxiliary bishops beneath them.

Three ranks of hierarchy 
There are three ranks of priesthood in the Syriac Orthodox Church:

Episcopate: Patriarch, Maphrian, archbishop and bishop.
Vicariate: chor-episcopos and priest or qasheesho.
Deaconate: archdeacon, evangelical-deacon, subdeacon, lector or qoruyo and singer or mzamrono.

The Church 
The Jacobite Syrian Orthodox Church of India established by Thomas the Apostle believed in apostolic succession by the Syriac Orthodox Church and traditions carried out by the early Church of the East. The Jacobite Syrian Orthodox Church believes in the Church of Antioch's rulings regarding the councils of the Christendom and promises made by the Holy Fathers of the Church of Antioch and the Church of Alexandria.

The Church believed in the Trinity, apostolic succession, Miaphysitism Christological doctrines, and the Saints' Communion with Heaven. It also believed in the Throne of Antioch established by Saint Peter and Saint Paul, and accepted the Petrine primacy and supremacy of Patriarchs akin to the Church of Rome. Those who follow the early theological doctrines from India are known as  Saint Thomas Christians. The Syrian Orthodox Church of India accepts Buddhism and Jewish traditions as a part of Christian culture. The church venerates icons. It has prayers to Geevarghese Gregorios of Perumpally, Curien Kaniyamparambil, and other people who controlled higher positions in the church. The Church has myths in India related to Hinduism regarding churches in Kerala and Tamil Nadu. It has major and minor pilgrim sites in the Manarcad Church.

 Manarcad Church is a pilgrimage site in Kerala and is known as the Global Marian Pilgrim Center. The Holy Girdle of the Virgin Mary was installed in 1953 by Ignatius Zakka I, and church construction was completed in 1954.
 Kothamangalam Cheriya Pally is a major pilgrimage site of the gathering church of whole religions.
 Piravom Church.
 St. George Jacobite Syrian Cathedral is the ancient cathedral named after Saint George, and was established in 722 AD.
 Vadakkan Paravoor Church is the church that entombed Gregorios Abdal Jaleel, who protected the original faith of the Jacobite Syrian Christian Church.
 St. Mary's Church, Kundara, located in the Kollam district of Kerala, is the traditional church of the Pakalomattam family. The saints of the Pakalomattam family are Saint Alphonsa, Kuriakose Elias Chavara, and Kuriakose Mar Gregorios (Pampady Thirumeni).

Tradition
The Syrian Christians accepted the traditions of the Syriac traditional Indian Church. The rituals incorporated into Syrian Christianity from other religions include many different blessings and processions. The Syrian Christians have a prominent position given by Maharajas.

The Minnukettu and Manthrakodi are Syrian Orthodox rituals adhered to by the Malankara Church. They approved by Ignatius Peter IV, the Patriarch of Antioch. The Manthrakodi is known as sari for a bridegroom, and the Minnu is the ritual layout of a wedding ceremony in a shape resembling wheat, which represents rebirth and resurrection.
The Procession is the ritual of the Bible being shown to everyone at Mass, an existing tradition in Hinduism and Syriac Christianity.
Chattayum Mundum is the traditional dress of Syriac Christians; it was inspired by Jewish and Mohammedan culture.
The Onam is a festival in Kerala.

Relics

The Syriac Orthodox Church respects the relics of Saint Mary, forefathers, and saints. The most venerated relics of the Syrian Orthodox Church are the Holy Girdle found from the olden manuscripts by Ignatius Aphrem I and the relics of the Thomas the Apostle discovered by Ignatius Zakka I. The Jacobite Syrian Orthodox Church kept some of these relics and celebrated on occasions.

Liturgy 

The liturgical service is called Holy Qurobo in the Syriac language. The Liturgy of Saint James is celebrated on Sundays and special occasions. The Holy Eucharist consists of Gospel reading, Bible readings, prayers, and songs. Apart from certain readings, prayers are sung in the form of chants and melodies. Hundreds of melodies remain preserved in the book known as Beth Gazo.

Holy Bible 
The Syriac Orthodox Church respects the Bible in the Church of tradition and liturgy. It preserves the Syriac manuscripts of the Bible and other holy books. The Syriac name of Peshitta is Vishudhagrandham (വിശുദ്ധ ഗ്രന്ഥം) in Malayalam, translated by Fr. Kurien Kaniamparambil.

Prayers 
The Jacobite Syrian Christians pray from the Shehimo during canonical hours in accordance with Psalm 119. In 1910, Reverend Konattu Mathen Malpan translated the prayer book of the Syrian orthodox church into Malayalam, known as Pampakuda Namaskaram, with permission from Ignatius Abded Aloho II. It is the common prayer book of Syrian Orthodox Christians in India.

Theology 
The Jacobite Syrian Christian Church officially accepted Miaphysitism per pictorial evidence in St. Mary's Knanaya Church of Kottayam, Piravom Church, and Mulanthuruthy Church.

However, it does not refute the Church of the East's relationship with the earlier church, and as the Church of the East never professed the alleged Nestorianism, it is held as a misnomer and false accusation according to most historians.

Nasrani Cross 
The Nasrani Cross (Persian cross) is used by Syrian Christians of India. It spread in the early fourth century and is similar to the Armenian Cross of the Armenian Apostolic Church.

Seminary

The First major seminary is known as Manjanikkara Dayara (മഞ്ഞനിക്കര ദയറാ), and was established by Yulios Elias Qoro in 1932. The Manjanikkara Dayara motivated the study of Syriac Orthodox Church faith and established stronger spiritual relationships between churches. The Second major seminary is known as Malekurish Dayara (മലേകുരിശ് ദയറാ).

Dispute with Malankara Orthodox
The Jacobite Indian Orthodox and Malankara Orthodox Church regularly engage in disputes over the former's alignment to Miaphysitism from the time of Baradaeus and Severus of Antioch. The Jacobites lost many of its prominent churches to the Malankara Orthodox after the Supreme Court of India's verdict, despite having absolute majority in those churches. After the long struggle for talks on churches that were dismissed by Malankara, the Jacobite Syrian Church decided to end their sacramental relationship with them. Meanwhile, the Syriac Orthodox Church of India has developed relationships between the remaining Christian churches like the Mar Thoma Syrian Church, the Syro-Malankara Catholic Church, and the Syro-Malabar Church and with other religious leaders.

The Church has undergone a number of splits throughout the centuries since 1665.
Malabar Independent Syrian Church: first split on 1772
Mar Thoma Syrian Church: Second split on 1898
Malankara Orthodox Church: third split on 1911 and 1930
Syro-Malankara Catholic Church: fourth split on 1930

Cemetery ordinance 
As per Supreme Court Order 2017, the Syrian Church disputed its rights to attend holy mass and rituals and took the proposed ordinance for cemeteries. The ordinance gives the right for every person to attend rituals and laws passed on by the majority votes with the support of the chief minister, ministers and other Assembly members.

Sacramental relationships

Catholic Church
According to the Agreement of Pope John Paul II and Ignatius Zakka I, the Holy Catholic Church and Syriac Orthodox Church have a relationship between sacraments of Penance, Eucharist and Anointing of the Sick for a grave spiritual need.

Marthoma Syrian Church
The Mar Thoma Syrian Church also known as Malankara Mar Thoma, or Reformed Syrian church of Malabar and Jacobite Syrian Church attend prayer meetings and marriage ceremonies together. They continue their synods in recognition of theological acceptance and Holy Communion from their understanding. The Holy Muron of Mar Thoma Syrian Church was given by Ignatius Elias II in 1842 which decided the church will only use the ecclesiastical title of the names Ignatius and Baselios to honour the Syriac Orthodox Church.

Malankara Orthodox Church
The Malankara Orthodox Church is the excommunicated independent church of the Syriac Orthodox Church. The faction emerged in 1911 under the leadership of Dionysius of Vattasseril. Later, the Jacobite Syrian Christian Church consecrated a new Malankara metropolitan, Coorilos Paulose.

Politics

Some notable Kerala Legislative Assembly members from the church include Anoop Jacob, Eldo Abraham, Raju Abraham, Eldhose Kunnappilly, Dean Kuriakose, Benny Behanan.

Syriac Orthodox Patriarchal Delegates of India 

The Syriac Orthodox Patriarchal Delegates of India is the representative body of the patriarch of the Syriac Orthodox Church, who is sent to India to guide and administer the church, or on special occasions, as the representative of the Holy See of Antioch. Every year, Syriac Orthodox Patriarchal Delegates participate in the Manjanikkara Church Feast.

Catholicate

By the fifth century, the bishops of Rome, Constantinople, Alexandria, and Antioch gained control of the churches in surrounding cities. They became the heads of the regional churches, and were known as patriarchs. Outside of the Roman Empire, patriarchs were known as catholicos. After Nestorian Schism in the seventh century, the Syriac Orthodox Christians who lived in Persia began using the title for its maphrian, who was originally the head of the Syriac Orthodox Christian community in Persia. This office ranked right below the patriarch of Antioch in Syriac Orthodox church hierarchy, until it was abolished in 1860 and reinstated in 1964.

Catholicos of India

The Maphrian of India(Catholicos) is an ecclesiastical office of the Syriac Orthodox Church and the head of the Jacobite Syrian Christian Church. He is the Catholicos of the Jacobite Syrian Christian Church, an autonomous body within the Syriac Orthodox Church. The jurisdiction of Catholicos was in India of the East, so Syriac Orthodox Church Catholicos of the East was renamed the Catholicos of India in 2002. The position remained vacant between 1996 and 2002.

Proclaimed saints of the Church 

The Church venerates the saints of the Syriac Orthodox Church along with regional saints of the Church declared by the Syriac Orthodox Patriarch of Antioch and All the East.

 Ignatius Elias III: entombed in Manjanikkara Dayara at Omallur
 Baselios Yeldo: entombed in Kothamangalam cheria pally
 Parumala Thirumeni (Geevarghese Gregorious): entombed in Parumala Church
 Paulose Athanasius: entombed in Aluva Thrikkunnathu Seminary
 Koorilos Paulose: entombed in Panampady Church
 Koorilos Yuyakkim: entombed in Mulanthuruthy Marthoman Church
 Osthatheos Sleeba: entombed in Arthat St.Mary's Simhasana Church, Kunnamkulam
 Baselios Sakralla III of Aleppo: entombed at Morth Mariam Cathedral, Kandanad
 Gregorios Abdal Jaleel: entombed at St. Thomas Church North Paravur

Dioceses

Dioceses in Kerala
Kollam Diocese
Thumpamon Diocese
Niranam Diocese
Kottayam Diocese
Idukki Diocese
 Kandanad Diocese
Kochi Diocese
Angamaly Diocese
 Angamaly
 Perumbavoor
 Pallikkara
 Muvattupuzha
 Kothamangalam
 Highrange
 Thrissur Diocese
Kozhikode Diocese
Malabar Diocese

Dioceses outside Kerala
Mangalore Diocese
Bangalore Diocese
Mylapore Diocese (formerly Chennai Diocese)
Mumbai Diocese
Delhi Diocese

Bishops of the church 

 Gregorios Joseph
 Severios Abhraham
 Alexandrios Thomas
 Thimotheos Thomas
 Thimotheos Mathews
 Ivaniyos Mathews
 Aprem Mathews
 Theodosius Mathews
 Anthimos Mathews
 Athanasius Elias
 Yulios Elias
 Philoxenos Zacharias
 Athanasios Geevargees
 Divanasios Geevargees
 Coorilos Geevargees
 Barnabas Geevargees
 Meletius yuhanon
 Dioscorus Kuriakose
 Theophilose Kuriakose
 Clemis Kuriakos
 Eusebios Kuriakose
 Anthonios Yakkoob
 Osthatheos Issac

See also 
 List of Patriarchs of Antioch – to 518
 List of Syriac Orthodox Patriarchs of Antioch – list from 518
Maphrian of the East
Catholicos of India
Maphrian
 Oriental Orthodox Church
 Saint Thomas Christians
Saint Thomas Anglicans
 Manarcad church

References

Sources

External links
 

Jacobite Syrian Christian Church
1665 establishments in India
Oriental Orthodox organizations established in the 20th century
Affiliated institutions of the National Council of Churches in India